The 1960 Coupe de France Final was a football match played at Stade Olympique Yves-du-Manoir, Colombes on 15 May 1960 that saw AS Monaco FC defeat AS Saint-Étienne 4–2 thanks to goals by Serge Roy (2), Henri Biancheri and François Ludwikowski.

Match details

See also
1959–60 Coupe de France

External links
Coupe de France results at Rec.Sport.Soccer Statistics Foundation
Report on French federation site

Coupe
1960
Coupe De France Final 1960
Coupe De France Final 1960
Sport in Hauts-de-Seine
May 1960 sports events in Europe
1960 in Paris